Severance is the debut album by Australian melodic death metal band Daysend. It was released by Chatterbox Records in Australia on 3 November 2003 and in the United States by Metal Blade and Europe by Locomotive Records in November 2004. The song "Beggars With Knives" was included on the Faultline Records compilation album Metal for the Brain 2005 in 2005. Severance took ten days to record and was produced by DW Norton and Nik Tropiano.

Track listing
"Born is the Enemy" − 5:21
"Ignorance of Bliss" − 4:29
"Blood of Angels" − 3:54
"Countdown" − 5:20
"Prism of You" − 3:40
"End of Days" − 4:09
"Severance Day" − 3:41
"Sellout" − 4:33
"September" − 4:09
"Beggars With Knives" − 3:04
"Sibling" − 7:00

Personnel
Simon Calabrese - Vocals
Meredith Webster - Bass
Aaron Bilbija - Lead Guitar
Wayne Morris - Drums
Michael Kordek - Rhythm Guitar

2003 debut albums
Daysend albums